Nicholas Mallett (6 May 1945 – 30 January 1997) was a British television director.

Mallett was a production unit manager on Blake's 7. As a director, he was responsible for three Doctor Who serials between 1986 and 1989: The Mysterious Planet starring Colin Baker, Paradise Towers and The Curse of Fenric (both starring Sylvester McCoy).

Mallett also directed episodes of Crossroads, Children's Ward and The Bill.

External links
 

1997 deaths
British television producers
1945 births